Nannaethiops is a genus of distichodontid freshwater fishes found in Africa.

Distribution 
Found in Cameroon, Nigeria, Gabon, Republic of the Congo and Democratic Republic of Congo. It’s been observed in several river systems including the Congo, Niger and Cross.

Species
There are two recognized species:

 Nannaethiops bleheri Géry & Zarske, 2003
 Nannaethiops unitaeniatus Günther, 1872 (one-line tetra)

References

Distichodontidae
Fish of Africa
Taxa named by Albert Günther